The Mitchell House is a historic house at 1415 Spring Street in Little Rock, Arkansas.  It is a two-story frame structure with Colonial Revival and Craftsman features, designed by Charles L. Thompson and built in 1911.  It has a three-bay facade, with wide sash windows flanking a center entrance and Palladian window.  The center bay is topped by a gable that has large Craftsman-style brackets.  A porch shelters the entrance, which is topped by a four-light transom window, and has a small fixed-pane window to its right.

The house was listed on the National Register of Historic Places in 1982, and was delisted in 2021.

See also
National Register of Historic Places listings in Little Rock, Arkansas

References

Houses on the National Register of Historic Places in Arkansas
Colonial Revival architecture in Arkansas
Houses completed in 1911
Houses in Little Rock, Arkansas
National Register of Historic Places in Little Rock, Arkansas
Former National Register of Historic Places in Arkansas